Andromeda XVIII, discovered in 2008, is a dwarf spheroidal galaxy (has no rings, low luminosity, much dark matter, little gas or dust), which is a satellite of the Andromeda Galaxy (M31). It is one of the 14 known dwarf galaxies orbiting M31. It was announced in 2010 that the orbiting galaxies lie close to a plane running through M31's center.

See also

 List of Andromeda's satellite galaxies

References

Dwarf spheroidal galaxies
Andromeda Subgroup
Andromeda (constellation)